Wilhelm Adalbert Hosenfeld (2 May 1895 – 13 August 1952), originally a school teacher, was a German Army officer who by the end of the Second World War had risen to the rank of Hauptmann (captain). He helped to hide or rescue several Polish people, including Jews, in Nazi-German occupied Poland, and helped Jewish pianist and composer Władysław Szpilman to survive, hidden, in the ruins of Warsaw during the last months of 1944, an act which was portrayed in the 2002 film The Pianist. He was taken prisoner by the Red Army and died in Soviet captivity in 1952.

In October 2007, Hosenfeld was posthumously honoured by the president of Poland Lech Kaczyński with a Commander’s Cross of the Order of Polonia Restituta. In June 2009, Hosenfeld was posthumously recognized in Yad Vashem (Israel's official memorial to the victims of the Holocaust) as one of the Righteous Among the Nations.

Early life and World War I

Hosenfeld was born into the family of a pious Roman Catholic schoolmaster living near Fulda. His family life had a Catholic character, and Christian charitable work was emphasized during his education. He was influenced by the Catholic Action and Church-inspired social work, and also by Prussian obedience, by German patriotism, and, during his marriage, by the increasing pacifism of his wife, Annemarie. He was also influenced by the Wandervogel movement (a German youth political group). and its adherents. From 1914, he saw active service in the First World War, and after being severely wounded in 1917, Hosenfeld received the Iron Cross Second Class.

World War II

Hosenfeld was drafted into the Wehrmacht in August 1939 and was stationed in Poland from mid-September 1939 until his capture by the Soviet Army on 17 January 1945. His first destination in Poland was Pabianice, where he was involved in the building and running of a POW camp. Next, he was stationed in Węgrów in December 1939, where he remained until his battalion was moved another 30  km away to Jadów at the end of May 1940. He was finally transferred to Warsaw in July 1940, where he spent the rest of the war, for the most part, attached to Wach-Bataillon (guard battalion) 660, part of the Wach-Regiment Warschau (Warsaw Guard Regiment) in which he served as a staff officer and as the battalion sports officer. He was responsible for sports events at the Army Stadium in Warsaw.

A member of the Nazi Party since 1935, as time passed Hosenfeld grew disillusioned with the party and its policies, especially as he saw how Poles, and especially Jews, were treated. He and several fellow German Army officers felt sympathy for all peoples of occupied Poland. Ashamed of what some of their countrymen were doing, they offered help to those they could whenever possible.

Hosenfeld befriended numerous Poles and even made an effort to learn their language. He also attended Mass, received Holy Communion, and went to confession in Polish churches, even though this was forbidden. His actions on behalf of Poles began as early as autumn 1939, when against regulations he allowed Polish prisoners of war access to their families and even pushed successfully for the early release of at least one. During his time in Warsaw, Hosenfeld used his position to give refuge to people, regardless of their background, including at least one politically persecuted anti-Nazi ethnic German, who were in danger of persecution, even arrest by the Gestapo, sometimes by getting them the papers they needed and jobs at the sports stadium that was under his oversight. Hosenfeld surrendered to the Soviets at Błonie, a small Polish city about 30 km west of Warsaw, with the men of a Wehrmacht company he was leading.

Imprisonment and death
He was sentenced to 25 years of hard labor for alleged war crimes, on account of his unit affiliation. In a 1946 letter to his wife in West Germany, Hosenfeld named the Jews whom he had saved and begged her to contact them and ask them to arrange his release.

In 1950, the pianist Władysław Szpilman learned the name of the German officer who had offered him assistance in 1944. After much soul searching, Szpilman sought the intercession of a man whom he privately considered "a bastard", Jakub Berman, the head of the Polish secret police. Several days later, Berman paid a visit to Szpilman's home and said that there was nothing he could do. He added, "If your German were still in Poland, then we could get him out. But our comrades in the Soviet Union won't let him go. They say your officer belonged to a detachment involved in spying – so there is nothing we can do about it as Poles, and I am powerless".

Szpilman never believed Berman's claims of powerlessness. In an interview with Wolf Biermann, Szpilman described Berman as "all powerful by the grace of Stalin," and lamented, "So I approached the worst rogue of the lot, and it did no good." Hosenfeld died in a Soviet prison camp on 13 August 1952, shortly before 22:00, from a rupture of the thoracic aorta, possibly sustained during torture.

Commemoration
In 2002, The Pianist, a film based on Szpilman's memoirs of the same name, portrayed Hosenfeld's rescue of Władysław Szpilman. Hosenfeld was played by Thomas Kretschmann.

In October 2007, Hosenfeld was posthumously honoured by the president of Poland Lech Kaczyński with a Commander’s Cross of the Order of Polonia Restituta.

Szpilman's son, Andrzej Szpilman, had long called for Yad Vashem to recognize Wilm Hosenfeld as a Righteous Among the Nations, non-Jews who risked their lives to rescue Jews.

On 25 November 2008, Yad Vashem posthumously recognized Hosenfeld as Righteous Among the Nations. On 19 June 2009, Israeli diplomats presented Hosenfeld's son, Detlev, with the award, in Berlin.

On December 4, 2011, a commemorative plaque in Polish and English was unveiled at 223 Niepodległości Avenue in Warsaw, the place where Hosenfeld discovered Szpilman, in the presence of Hosenfeld's daughter Jorinde.

Awards and decorations
 Iron Cross of 1914, 2nd class (1917)
 Honor Cross of World War 1914/1918
 Wound Badge in Black (1918)
 SA-Sports Badge in Bronze
 Commander’s Cross of the Order of Polonia Restituta (Poland, October 2007)
 Righteous Among the Nations (25 November 2008)

See also

Oskar Schindler
Angel Sanz Briz
Karl Plagge
Albert Göring
John Rabe
Raoul Wallenberg
Aristides de Sousa Mendes

References and notes

Sources
Vogel, Thomas, ed.: Wilm Hosenfeld: "Ich versuche jeden zu retten"—Das Leben eines deutschen Offiziers in Briefen und Tagebüchern (Wilm Hosenfeld: "'I try to save each one [I can]'—The life of a German officer in letters and diaries"). Compiled and with commentary by Thomas Vogel, Militärgeschichtlichen Forschungsamt (MGFA: Military History Research Institute). Deutsche Verlags-Anstalt, Munich, 2004.   
Szpilman, Władysław. The Pianist: The Extraordinary True Story of One Man's Survival in Warsaw, 1939–1945. Picador; 2nd edition, 2002  (ISBN ),  (ISBN ). This book includes a foreword by Andrzej Szpilman, excerpts from Hosenfeld's diary, and an epilogue in the form of an essay by Wolf Biermann.

External links
Wilm Hosenfeld, A Man Of courage
– The story of Wilm Hosenfeld
Comment on Hosenfeld in conjunction with Roman Polanski's filmThe Pianist
Page on Wilm Hosenfeld and The Pianist on the website of Hosenfeld's grandson
 "Dziennik" 13 Oct. 2007  re posthumous award of Polonia Restituta – In Polish
Wilm Hosenfeld at Yad Vashem website

1895 births
1952 deaths
People from Fulda (district)
People from Hesse-Nassau
German Roman Catholics
German Righteous Among the Nations
Catholic Righteous Among the Nations
Roman Catholics in the German Resistance
Recipients of the Iron Cross (1914), 2nd class
Commanders of the Order of Polonia Restituta
German prisoners of war in World War II held by the Soviet Union
German people who died in Soviet detention
Władysław Szpilman
Nazi-era German officials who resisted the Holocaust
German Army officers of World War II